Neil Broad and Kevin Ullyett were the defending champions, but lost in semifinals to Michael Kohlmann and Nicklas Kulti.

David Adams and Jeff Tarango won the title by defeating Michael Kohlmann and Nicklas Kulti 6–3, 6–7(5–7), 7–6(7–5) in the final.

Seeds

Draw

Draw

References
 Official Results Archive (ATP)
 Official Results Archive (ITF)

Bournemouth International - Doubles, 1999
Brighton International